Brian James Reith, better known as B. Reith, is a Christian hip hop/pop singer and rapper. He began his musical career with the release of his first album, "Urgent Message", in 2003. In 2008, Reith signed to Gotee Records and released his EP The Forecast. Later that year, he toured with TobyMac on the Winter Wonder Slam tour. In September 2009, Reith released his second album, Now Is Not Forever, which charted at No. 2 on the R&B/Hip-Hop Albums chart and No. 32 on the Heatseekers chart. The album spawned the singles "Antidote", which peaked at No. 50 on the Christian Songs chart, and "The Comeback Kid".

In early 2011, Reith released a buzz single "Knockin On My Door". On November 11, 2011, Reith released his third album, How the Story Ends. On September 2, 2016, Reith released a crowdfunded EP called Heart on My Sleeve, through Pledge Music.

Early life
Brian James Reith grew up in Milwaukee, Wisconsin, where his father, Jim, owned and operated a recording studio. At a young age, he was exposed to music and soon took an interest in it; Reith sang on his first commercial at the age of five.

Musical career
Reith's musical career began when he released an independent album, Urgent Message, in 2003. Christian singer and Gotee Records manager TobyMac discovered his music in 2006. TobyMac reportedly pulled his car off to the side of the road when he first heard Reith's music, later stating: "Brian is just naturally gifted from God vocally and his lyrics [...] sort of just ease into your heart." In 2008, Reith signed to Gotee Records and released his EP The Forecast in May 2008.

At the end of the year, he guested on TobyMac's annual 2008 Winter Wonder Slam tour, which ran through November and December 2008. On March 10, 2009, an expanded edition of his EP was digitally-released, featuring two more songs and two music videos. Reith's first full-length album, Now Is Not Forever, was released on September 22, 2009. In late 2009, Reith toured again with TobyMac on the Winter Wonder Slam tour.

In early 2011, Reith released a buzz single "Knockin On My Door". His third studio album, How the Story Ends, was released on November 1, 2011.

On September 2, 2016, Reith released his crowdfunded EP Heart on My Sleeve, through Pledge Music. The EP was released on regular digital markets on October 14, 2016. On October 21, 2017, Reith released the EP Heart on My Sleeve (Acoustic).

Style
Reith's style is based on a combination of hip hop and pop music. His lyrical style has been compared to Christian rapper KJ-52, specifically in Reith's song "Go On".

Discography

Albums

EPs
 2004: One Down
 2006: The Introproduction EP
 2008: The Forecast EP
 2009: The B. Reith EP
 2016: Heart on My Sleeve EP
 2017: Heart on My Sleeve (Acoustic) EP

Mixtapes
 2012: How the Story Continues

Singles

Tours

 2008: Winter Wonder Slam Tour (with TobyMac)
 2009: Creation Festival: The Tour
 2009: Winter Wonder Slam Tour (with TobyMac)
 2009: The Comeback Kid Tour
 2012: Synergy (with Mali Music)
 2015: Northern Lights Tour (with Christon Gray & Swoope)

Awards and nominations

References

External links
 
 
 
 B. Reith at Discogs

American performers of Christian music
Performers of Christian hip hop music
Gotee Records artists
American hip hop musicians
Musicians from Milwaukee
Living people
1982 births